Afrotarsius is a primate found in the Paleogene of Africa.

The first species to be named, Afrotarsius chatrathi, was named in 1985 on the basis of a single lower jaw from the Oligocene of Fayum, Egypt, and tentatively referred to the tarsier family (Tarsiidae). However, this relationship immediately proved controversial, and in 1987 the animal was placed in a separate family Afrotarsiidae related to simians. A tarsier-like tibiofibula was allocated to Afrotarsius in 1998, but the identity of this bone is controversial. In 2010, a second species of the genus, Afrotarsius libycus, was named from the Eocene of Dur At-Talah, Libya, on the basis of isolated upper and lower teeth. Features of these teeth were interpreted as additional evidence for a relationship between Afrotarsius and anthropoids. A second afrotarsiid genus, Afrasia, was named in 2012 from the Eocene Pondaung Formation of Myanmar. In the same paper, Afrotarsiidae was placed together with the Asian Eosimiidae in an infraorder Eosimiiformes, in the simians. However, some studies indicate that it should be placed in Tarsiiformes.

Evolutionary history

References

Literature cited

 

Eocene primates
Eocene mammals of Africa
Eocene genus first appearances
Oligocene extinctions
Oligocene primates
Oligocene mammals of Africa
Prehistoric primate genera
Fossil taxa described in 1985